Lancaster Football Club is an Australian Rules Football team based in Lancaster, North Eastern Victoria, Australia. The club was established in 1910 as a junior team and first made a senior team in 1932 in the Kyabram & District Football League. The team is known as The Wombats.

Honours

Premierships
1932 (Kyabram & District Football League)
1980 (Kyabram & District Football League)
1981 (Kyabram & District Football League)
1988 (Kyabram & District Football League)
1992 (Kyabram & District Football League)
2001 (Kyabram & District Football League)
2011 (Kyabram & District Football League)
2022 (Kyabram & District Football League)

KDFL Senior Best & Fairest Winners
1952 E.Wade
1956 F.Salmon (tied)
1994 R.Demarte
2001 A.Thomas
2008 C.Eddy
2009 P.Burnett
2011 S.Thomson
2021 T.Davies

KDFL Reserves Best & Fairest Winner
2007 Roy Emini
2008 Anthony 'Rusty' McDonell
2009 Anthony 'Rusty' McDonell
2015 Harley Hoing

KDFL Leading Goal Kickers
1982 T. Coulstock 79
1983 T. Coulstock 65

References

Kyabram & District Football League clubs
1910 establishments in Australia
Australian rules football clubs established in 1910